TV Wattenscheid 01 Leichtathletik is a German sports club focused on athletics. Founded in 1971 in Wattenscheid, Bochum in the Western part of Germany, the club's history is linked to that of an older club, Turnverein Wattenscheid 01, a gymnastics club in the city which was formed in 1901. The club's main stadium for events and training is Lohrheidestadion.

The athletics section of the club grew in the mid-1960s and received sponsorship from Klaus Steilmann, a local businessman who was involved with textile manufacturing. Shortly after, the team split away from the main club to form a distinct, athletics-specific club. Among the club's first internationally successful athletes was Sabine Braun, who was twice heptathlon world champion. The current chairman of the club is former sprint athlete Jörg Klocke.

Athletes
The club is among the most successful in Germany and has had many international athletes as members.

 Jan Fitschen, European champion at 10,000 metres
 Melanie Paschke, World sprint relay champion
 Christian Nicolay, European junior champion in javelin
 Raymond Hecht, German javelin throw record holder
 Katja Tengel, Olympic sprinter
 Sina Schielke, European sprint medallist
 Ronny Ostwald, European sprint medallist
 Alexander Kosenkow, European sprint medallist
 Sebastian Ernst, European junior champion in 200 m
 Bastian Swillims, European indoor sprint medallist
 Monika Merl, multiple German 800 m champion
 Willi Mathiszik, World Championships competitor in the 110 m hurdles
 Kerstin Werner, German champion in 1500 m
 Henning Hackelbusch, European Championships competitor in the 400 m hurdles
 Eleni Gebrehiwot, Münster Marathon winner
 Irina Mikitenko, three-time World Marathon Majors winner
 Denise Hinrichs, European indoor shot put medallist
 Denise Krebs, German champion in 1500 m
 Christoph Lohse, World Indoor Championships competitor in the 1500 m
 Michael Möllenbeck, world discus medallist
 Julian Reus, European indoor sprint medallist
 Marion Rothhaar, Multiple German champion, gymnastics

References

External links

Official website

Athletics clubs in Germany
Sport in Bochum
1971 establishments in Germany
Sports clubs established in 1971